José Freire de Olivera Neto (March 9, 1928 – January 10, 2012) was the bishop of the Roman Catholic Diocese of Mossoró, Brazil.

Ordained to the priesthood in 1956, Freire de Olivera Neto became bishop in 1973 retiring in 2004. And he was Brazilian.

Notes

20th-century Roman Catholic bishops in Brazil
1928 births
2012 deaths
21st-century Roman Catholic bishops in Brazil
Roman Catholic bishops of Mossoró